Gulzar Bhulkani is Union council of Jacobabad District in the Balochistan province of Pakistan. It is located at 28°13'40N 69°3'40E to the east of the district capital Jacobabad with an altitude of 73 metres (242 feet).

References

Populated places in Balochistan, Pakistan
Jacobabad District